Bharinda is a small village in the tehsil of Rajgarh in Churu district in the state of Rajasthan in India. 

The gram panchayat of the area is the neighbouring village of Bhainsali.

Population - 2500 (estimated in 2009)

Voters - 850

References
http://wikimapia.org/17129158/Late-Shri-Ashu-Singh-Rathore-s-PLOT-in-Bharinda
http://mapcarta.com/26383318

Villages in Churu district